Susanna Harvey can refer to:
 Susanna Hopton née Harvey (1627–1709), an English devotional writer.
 Susanna Keir née Harvey (1747-1802), a British novelist